The Galway Senior Hurling Championship (known for sponsorship reasons as the Brooks Galway Senior Hurling Championship) is an annual hurling competition organised by the Galway County Board of the Gaelic Athletic Association since 1887 for the top hurling teams in the county of Galway in Ireland.

The series of games are played during the summer and autumn months with the county final currently being played at Pearse Stadium in November. Initially played as a knock-out competition, the championship currently consists of a group stage followed by a knock-out series of games.

The Galway County Championship is an integral part of the wider All-Ireland Senior Club Hurling Championship. The winners of the Galway county final automatically represent Connacht and join the champions of the other three provinces to contest the All-Ireland Championship.

Twenty-four teams currently participate in the Galway County Championship. The title has been won at least once by 29 different teams. The all-time record-holders are Castlegar, who have won a total of 17 titles.

St. Thomas's are the title-holders, having defeated Loughrea by 1-15 to 0-17 in the 2022 decider.

History

Beginnings
Following the foundation of the Gaelic Athletic Association in 1884, new rules for Gaelic football and hurling were drawn up and published in the United Irishman newspaper. In 1886, county committees were established, with the Galway County Board affiliating on 26 October 1886. The inaugural championship was played during the summer of 1887. Delays and objections were commonplace in the early years, with a number of championships remaining unfinished.

Format

Group stage
Senior A
For the group stage there are three groups of four teams. Teams play the other three teams in the group once and match points are awarded depending on the result of each game, with teams receiving two points for a win, and one for a draw. Following the completion of the group stage, the top team from each group plus one drawn 2nd place team automatically qualify for the quarter finals. The remaining two 2nd placed teams go to the Preliminary Quarter finals. The bottom team in each group is relegated to Senior B for 2022

Senior B
For the group stage there are three groups of four teams. Teams play the other three teams in the group once and match points are awarded depending on the result of each game, with teams receiving two points for a win, and one for a draw. Following the completion of the group stage, the top two teams of each group qualify for the preliminary quarter-finals. The winners of each group play in Senior A in 2022. The last placed team in each group enter into a relegation playoff to play Intermediate in 2022.

Relegation
Senior A
The bottom-placed teams from each group are relegated to the Senior B section for the following year.

Senior B
The bottom-placed teams from each group play-off with the losing team relegated to the Galway Intermediate Hurling Championship for the following year.

Knock-out stage
Preliminary quarter-finals: 8 teams contest this round. The 4 winning teams advance to the quarter-final. The 4 losing teams are eliminated from the championship.

Quarter-finals: 8 teams contest this round. The 4 winning teams advance to the semi-finals. The 4 losing teams are eliminated from the championship.
 
Semi-finals: 4 teams contest this round. The 2 winning teams advance to the final. The 2 losing teams are eliminated from the championship.

Final: The final is contested by the two semi-final winners.

Venues

Early rounds

Fixtures in the opening rounds of the championship are usually played at a neutral venue that is deemed halfway between the participating teams. Some of the more common venues include Kenny Park, Duggan Park and St Brendan's Park.

Final
The final has regularly been played at Pearse Stadium in Salthill.

Managers

Managers in the Galway Championship are involved in the day-to-day running of the team, including the training, team selection, and sourcing of players. Their influence varies from club-to-club and is related to the individual club committees. The manager is assisted by a team of two or three selectors and a backroom team consisting of various coaches.

Winners

Roll of honour

 1956 Awarded to Turloughmore

Records and statistics

Teams

By decade

The most successful team of each decade, judged by number of Galway Senior Hurling Championship titles, is as follows:

 1880s: 1 each for Meelick (1887) and Peterswell (1889)
 1890s: 3 for Ardrahan (1894-95-96)
 1900s: 4 for Peterswell (1900-04-05-07)
 1910s: 2 each for Kilconieron (1912–19), Woodfield (1913–17), Gort (1914–16) and Craughwell (1915–18)
 1920s: 5 for Tyangh (1920-22-23-25-28)
 1930s: 4 for Castlegar (1936-37-38-39)
 1940s: 3 for Liam Mellows (1943-45-46)
 1950s: 5 for Castlegar (1950-52-53-57-58)
 1960s: 6 for Turloughmore (1961-62-63-64-65-66)
 1970s: 3 each for Castlegar (1972-73-79) and Ardrahan (1974-75-78)
 1980s: 2 each for Sarsfields (1980–89) and Gort (1981–83)
 1990s: 4 each for Sarsfields (1992-93-95-97) and Athenry (1994-96-98-99)
 2000s: 5 for Portumna (2003-05-07-08-09)
 2010s: 4 for St. Thomas's (2012-16-18-19)

Gaps

Top five longest gaps between successive championship titles:
 65 years: Loughrea (1941-2006)
 47 years: Liam Mellows (1970-2017)
 47 years: Gort (1934-1981)
 39 years: Ardrahan (1910-1949)
 28 years: Gort (1983-2011)

References

External links
Official Galway Website
Galway on Hoganstand
Galway Club GAA

 
Galway GAA club championships
1
Senior hurling county championships